The France national futsal team is controlled by the French Football Federation, the governing body for futsal in France and represents the country in international futsal competitions, such as the FIFA Futsal World Cup and the European Championships.

Competition history

FIFA Futsal World Cup

 1989 - did not compete
 1992 - did not compete
 1996 - did not compete
 2000 - did not qualify
 2004 - did not qualify
 2008 - did not compete
 2012 - did not qualify
 2016 - did not qualify
 2020 - did not qualify

UEFA Futsal Championship

 1996 - did not compete
 1999 - did not qualify
 2001 - did not qualify
 2003 - did not qualify
 2005 - did not qualify
 2007 - did not qualify
 2010 - did not qualify
 2012 - did not qualify
 2014 - did not qualify
 2016 - did not qualify
 2018 - Group Stage
 2022 - did not qualify

Players

Current squad
The following players were called up to the squad for the UEFA 2024 FIFA Futsal World Cup qualification matches against Norway and Serbia on 2 and 7 March 2023, respectively.
Head coach: Raphaël Reynaud

Recent call-ups
The following players have also been called up to the squad within the last 12 months.

COV Player withdrew from the squad due to contracting COVID-19.
INJ Player withdrew from the squad due to an injury.
PRE Preliminary squad.
RET Retired from international futsal.

Fixtures

Results and schedule

The box below, shows the results of all matches played in the recent past, and the scheduled matches in the near future.

2015

2016

References

External links
 Official website

France
National sports teams of France
Futsal in France